In agricultural policy, the intervention price is the price at which national intervention agencies in the EU are obliged to purchase any amount of a commodity offered to them regardless of the level of market prices (assuming that these commodities meet designated specifications and quality standards).  Thus, the intervention price serves as a floor for market prices.  Intervention purchases have constituted one of the principal policy mechanisms regulating EU markets in sugar, cereal grains, butter and skimmed milk powder, and (until 2002) beef.

References 

Agricultural economics
European Union